Tomas Van Den Spiegel (born 10 July 1978 in Ghent, Belgium) is a Belgian former professional basketball player and the current president of ULEB. At a height of 2.14 m (7 ft ) tall, he played at the center position.

Basketball playing career

Pro clubs
Van Den Spiegel first began playing basketball in the youth age club ranks of Osiris Denderleeuw, from 1987 to 1995, and then with the youth clubs of Okapi Aalst. He debuted at age 17, in the Belgian first division. He was named Belgian League Rookie of the year in 1996. In 1997, he moved to Sunair Oostende. With Oostende, he won two Belgian League championship titles and 2 Belgian Cups.

In 2001, he was named the Belgian Player of the Year, and he then signed a three-year contract with the top-tier level Italian LBA League club Fortitudo Bologna, where he was a EuroLeague runner-up in 2004. He them moved to the Italian club Virtus Roma. After a season-and-a-half with Virtus Roma, he chose the Russian club CSKA Moscow, as his next career destination.

With CSKA Moscow, Van Den Spiegel won the EuroLeague championship in both 2006 and 2008. With CSKA, he was also a EuroLeague runner-up in 2007. With CSKA, Van Den Spiegel also won three Russian Championships and two Russian Cups.

After a couple of short stints, one in Poland with Prokom Trefl Sopot, and one in the Ukraine with Azovmash Mariupol, he played two seasons with Real Madrid. After moving to the Italian club Olimpia Milano for the 2010–11 season, he moved back to the Belgian League, in early 2011, as he signed a 4-and-a-half-year contract with Telenet Oostende in March 2011. He announced his retirement from playing basketball, in July 2013.

Belgian national team
Van Den Spiegel was also a member of the senior men's Belgian national basketball team. With Belgium's senior national team, he played at the EuroBasket 2011.

Executive career
In 2016, Van Den Spiegel became the President of the Union of European Leagues of Basketball (ULEB). Since 2018, Van Den Spiegel is the CEO of Flanders Classics.

References

External links
 Euroleague.net Profile
 Italian League Profile 
 Spanish League Profile 

1978 births
Living people
Asseco Gdynia players
Basketball executives
BC Azovmash players
BC Oostende players
Belgian expatriate basketball people in Spain
Belgian expatriate basketball people in Poland
Belgian expatriate basketball people in Ukraine
Belgian men's basketball players
Centers (basketball)
Belgian expatriate basketball people in Italy
Fortitudo Pallacanestro Bologna players
Liga ACB players
Okapi Aalstar players
Olimpia Milano players
Pallacanestro Virtus Roma players
PBC CSKA Moscow players
Real Madrid Baloncesto players
Sportspeople from Ghent